The Ghost of What You Used to Be is the fifth album by American alternative rock/pop-punk band Quietdrive. The album was officially announced on March 4, 2014, with the original time of release scheduled for mid-2014. However, the album was eventually pushed back with the album's artwork unveiled on November 9, 2014, and the album released on December 16, 2014.

Track listing

References 

2014 albums
Quietdrive albums